Fatou N'Diaye (born June 23, 1962 in Dakar, Senegal) is a French-Senegalese basketball player. N'Diaye has had 75 selections on the France women's national basketball team from 1986-1990.

References
Sports reference federation francaise de basket-ball

1962 births
Living people
People from Dakar
French women's basketball players
Senegalese women's basketball players
French sportspeople of Senegalese descent
20th-century French women